Black River High School may refer to:

 Black River High School (Sullivan, Ohio), United States
 Black River Public School (Holland, Michigan), United States
 Black River High School (Ludlow, Vermont), United States
 Black River High School (Black River, Jamaica)

See also 
 Black River (disambiguation)